Saturday is the ninth studio album by Ocean Colour Scene and first album by the band to be released on the Cooking Vinyl independent record label. The album was produced by Gavin Monaghan, who is also known for his work with Editors, Scott Matthews, Nizlopi and The Twang and engineered by Gazz Rogers. Saturday previously had the working title of 'Blue Sky Drinking' which was changed to 'Rockfield' and again shortly before its release to its eventual name of 'Saturday'.
The first single to be released from the album was 'Magic Carpet Days' as a digital download only single, the single failed to chart.
Upon its release Saturday débuted and peaked at #35 in the Official UK Album Chart.

The song Harry Kidnap was written in tribute to John Weller, the deceased father of Paul Weller, and Steve Cradock contributes lead vocals to his own song composition 'Postal'.

The album is to be released on limited edition green vinyl for the very first time as part of Record Store Day 2021.

Track listing

All songs written by Simon Fowler, Steve Cradock and Oscar Harrison, unless otherwise noted.

 100 Floors of Perception
 Mrs Maylie
 Saturday [Fowler, Cradock, Harrison, Sealey]
 Just a Little Bit of Love
 Old Pair of Jeans [Andy Bennett & Lee Burn]
 Sing Children Sing
 Harry Kidnap [Fowler, Cradock, Harrison, Sealey]
 Magic Carpet Days
 The Word
 Village Life
 Postal
 What's Mine Is Yours [Sealey]
 Fell In Love on the Street Again
 Rockfield
 Over My Head (iTunes Exclusive)

References

External links

Saturday at YouTube (streamed copy where licensed)

Ocean Colour Scene albums
2010 albums
Albums recorded at Rockfield Studios